The 1938 All-SEC football team consists of American football players selected to the All-Southeastern Conference (SEC) chosen by various selectors for the 1938 college football season. Tennessee won the conference.

All-SEC selections

Ends
Bowden Wyatt, Tennessee (College Football Hall of Fame) (AP-1, UP-1)
Ken Kavanaugh, LSU (College Football Hall of Fame) (AP-1, UP-2)
Marvin Franklin, Vanderbilt (AP-2, UP-1)
Ralph Wenzel, Tulane (AP-2, UP-2)

Tackles
Eddie Gatto, LSU (AP-1, UP-1)
Bo Russell, Auburn (AP-1, UP-1)
Maurice Holdgraff, Vanderbilt (AP-2, UP-2)
Ray Miller, Tulane (AP-2)
Abe Shires, Tennessee (UP-2)

Guards
Bob Suffridge, Tennessee (College Football Hall of Fame)  (AP-1, UP-1)
James L. Brooks, Georgia Tech (AP-1)
Lou Bostick, Alabama (UP-1)
John W. Goree, LSU (AP-2)
Milton Howell, Auburn (AP-2)
Ed Molinski, Tennessee (College Football Hall of Fame)  (UP-2)
Frank Koscis, Florida (UP-2)

Centers
Jack Chivington, Georgia Tech (AP-2, UP-1)
Quinton Lumpkin, Georgia (AP-1)
Cary Cox, Alabama (UP-2)

Quarterbacks
George Cafego, Tennessee (College Football Hall of Fame) (AP-1, UP-1)
Vic Bradford, Alabama (AP-2)
Bradley, Ole Miss (UP-2)

Halfbacks
Parker Hall, Ole Miss (College Football Hall of Fame) (AP-1, UP-1)
Warren Brunner, Tulane (AP-1, UP-1)
Spec Kelly, Auburn (AP-2, UP-2)
Dave Zoeller, Kentucky (AP-2)
Howard Ector, Georgia Tech (UP-2)

Fullbacks
Charlie Holm, Alabama (AP-1, UP-1)
Len Coffman, Tennessee (AP-2)
Fordham, Georgia (UP-2)

Key

AP = Associated Press.

UP = United Press

Bold = Consensus first-team selection by both AP and UP

See also
1938 College Football All-America Team

References

All-SEC
All-SEC football teams